Gerald Thomas Courell (28 July 1906 – 12 September 1983) was an Irish Gaelic football player, trainer and referee. At club level, he played with Ballina Stephenites and had All-Ireland SFC successes with the Mayo senior football team as both a player and a trainer.

Honours

Player

Mayo
All-Ireland Senior Football Championship: 1936
Connacht Senior Football Championship: 1929, 1930, 1931, 1932, 1935, 1936
National Football League: 1933–34 (c), 1934–35, 1935–36, 1936–37

Trainer

Mayo
All-Ireland Senior Football Championship: 1950, 1951
Connacht Senior Football Championship: 1948, 1949, 1950, 1951
National Football League: 1948–49

References

1906 births
1983 deaths
Ballina Stephenites Gaelic footballers
Mayo inter-county Gaelic footballers